Toksook Bay Airport  is a state-owned public-use airport located one nautical mile (1.8 km) east of the central business district of Toksook Bay, a city in the Bethel Census Area of the U.S. state of Alaska.

As per Federal Aviation Administration records, this airport had 4,875 passenger boardings (enplanements) in calendar year 2007, an increase of 6% from the 4,583 enplanements in 2006.

Facilities 
It has one runway designated 16/34 with a gravel surface measuring 3,218 by 60 feet (981 × 18 m).

Airlines and destinations 

Prior to its bankruptcy and cessation of all operations, Ravn Alaska served the airport from multiple locations.

Top destinations

References

External links 
 FAA Alaska airport diagram  (GIF)
 

Airports in the Bethel Census Area, Alaska